The Camp Edwards station was a railroad station located on Weaver Street in Camp Edwards. The station was torn down after the Korean War because of the disuse of Camp Edwards, a disuse which may very well have led to its virtual shut down in the early 1970s.

History
The station was originally built at the end of a spur to Camp Edwards. Over the years, the station was the place where many a recruit faced their last training before being sent overseas. The station was later demolished as the nearby Otis Air Force Base came into existence and troops were moved more by air then trains. The tracks to the station were later torn up and the overhangs on the platforms themselves were torn down when the tracks were removed. However, freight trains still are in service on the Massachusetts Military Reservation through Massachusetts Coastal Railroad.

References

Demolished buildings and structures in Massachusetts
Former railway stations in Massachusetts
Buildings and structures in Barnstable County, Massachusetts